Donald Walter Willson (January 13, 1913 – March 23, 1967) was a Canadian professional ice hockey forward who played 22 games in the National Hockey League for the Montreal Canadiens.

Willson was born in Chatham, Ontario, but grew up in Bradford, Ontario. In 1929 he joined the junior hockey team the Newmarket Redmen, and played with them in the Memorial Cup four times, winning in 1933. He moved on to the Toronto St. Michael's Majors in 1933, and was a member of the 1934 Memorial Cup-winning team.

In 1934, Willson entered senior hockey with the Oshawa Chevies for a season, then moved to England to play in the English National League with the Earls Court Rangers for two seasons.

Willson returned to North America for the 1937–38 season, when Willson played for the Verdun Maple Leafs and 18 games for the Montreal Canadiens. Willson played a further four games for the Canadiens in the 1938–39 season. Willson played the rest of the season for the New Haven Eagles and a further three seasons for the Eagles before Willson enlisted in the Royal Canadian Air Force for wartime service.

Willson returned after World War II and played four seasons of organized senior ice hockey before retiring in 1949. Willson died at a Toronto hospital in 1967 at the age of 54.

References

External links

1913 births
1967 deaths
Canadian expatriate ice hockey players in England
Canadian ice hockey centres
Earls Court Rangers players
Montreal Canadiens players
New Haven Eagles players
Ice hockey people from Ontario
Sportspeople from Simcoe County